Don Bridge or Donbridge or variant, may refer to:

 Don Bridge, South Yorkshire, England, UK; across the River Don
 Jarrow Bridge (formerly Don Bridge), Jarrow, South Tyneside, England, UK; across the River Don
 Don Bridge, Kingston Road (Toronto), Ontario, Canada; a road bridge over the Don River
 The Donbridge School, Rumukwuta, Obio-Akpor, Port Harcourt, Rivers State, Nigeria
  Sir Herbert Donbridge, a fictional character from Invisible Enemy (film)

See also

 
 
 Bridge of Don (disambiguation)
 Don River Bridge (disambiguation)
 Don River (disambiguation)
 Bridge (disambiguation)
 Don (disambiguation)